William Wright (January 5, 1911 – January 19, 1949) was an American actor. He was a leading man in films who was most popular in the 1940s when he was typically compared to Clark Gable, whose career was temporarily derailed by World War II.  Wright even played Gable's part in a 1945 musical comedy remake of It Happened One Night entitled Eve Knew Her Apples.  He also played Philo Vance in Philo Vance Returns (1947) and the title role in King of the Gamblers (1948).  Wright's other films include Eadie Was a Lady (1945), Rose of the Yukon (1949), Daughter of the Jungle (1949), and Impact (1949).  Wright died from cancer in 1949 at the age of 38.

Filmography

External links

American male film actors
1911 births
1949 deaths
20th-century American male actors
Deaths from cancer in Mexico